Marauder is the fifth studio album of Southern rock band Blackfoot, released in 1981.

The album continued in the same vein as their previous successes, Strikes (1979) and Tomcattin' (1980).  Opening up with the heavy "Good Morning", and including the ballad "Diary of a Workingman", Marauder also sported the hit "Fly Away", which reached No. 42, and another Shorty Medlocke appearance on the "Rattlesnake Rock n' Roller", this time with a spoken introduction and banjo solo. Marauder was the last of their albums that were purely hard, driving, rock – they unsuccessfully introduced synthesizers to their sound through the 1980s, and their popularity waned. Eduardo Rivadavia describes Marauder as "...one of the band's best hard rockers to date", and "the last great Blackfoot album".
 
The band officially broke up amid declining fortunes in the mid-1980s, though Medlocke resumed recording under the name Blackfoot a few years later. He is now, again, a member of Lynyrd Skynyrd.

Heavy metal band Exodus covered "Good Morning" which was released as a b-side to the single "The Lunatic Parade" (1990).

Track listing 
All songs written and composed by Rick Medlocke and Jakson Spires, except where noted.

Side one
 "Good Morning" – 3:36
 "Payin' for It" – 3:35
 "Diary of a Workingman" – 5:36
 "Too Hard to Handle" – 4:02
 "Fly Away" – 2:58

Side two
"Dry County" – 3:42
 "Fire of the Dragon" – 4:02
 "Rattlesnake Rock 'n' Roller" (Shorty Medlocke, Rick Medlocke, Spires) – 4:01 
 "Searchin'" – 5:43

Personnel 
All credits adapted from album liner notes.

Blackfoot
 Rickey Medlocke – lead vocals, guitar
 Charlie Hargrett – guitar
 Greg T. Walker – bass guitar, keyboards, vocals
 Jakson Spires – drums, percussion, vocals

Additional musicians
 Henry Weck – percussion
 Shorty Medlocke – banjo intro on track 8
 Magic Rooster, Pat McCaffrey – horns, keyboards
 David Cavender – trumpet
 Donna Davis, Pamela Vincent – backing vocals

Production
 Al Nalli – producer
 Henry Weck – producer, engineer
 Andy de Ganhal – mixing assistant

References

External links 
 Blackfoot - Marauder (1981) album review by Eduardo Rivadavia, credits & releases at AllMusic.com
 Blackfoot - Marauder (1981) album releases & credits at Discogs.com
 Blackfoot - Marauder (1981) album to be listened as stream at Spotify.com

1981 albums
Blackfoot (band) albums
Atco Records albums